Tsay Jaw-yang (2 January 1941 – 12 July 2008) was a Taiwanese politician who served as the country's minister of Transportation and Communications. He died of pneumonia on July 12, 2008, at the age of 67.

References

1941 births
2008 deaths
Taiwanese Ministers of Transportation and Communications
Deaths from pneumonia in Taiwan
Place of birth missing